Pseudophaloe promiscua is a moth of the family Erebidae first described by Vitor Osmar Becker and Espinosa in 2013. It is found in Costa Rica.

The length of the forewings is about 23 mm for males. The forewings are opaque black, with a small red dot at the base of the costa and median, oblique, yellow fascia from below the costa, across the cell to before the tornus. The hindwings are black with an iridescent blue reflex.

Etymology
The species name is derived from Latin promiscuus (meaning mixed).

References

Moths described in 2013
Pseudophaloe